Goldtop may refer to:

 Goldtop: Groups & Sessions '74–'94, a 1995 compilation album by Snowy White
 Goldtop, a Gibson Les Paul guitar
 Gold top milk, or Channel Island milk
 Goldtop Recordings, an imprint of Jungle Records in collaboration with Goldtop Studio
 "Goldtop", a song by Inspiral Carpets from the 2007 album Keep the Circle: B-Sides and Udder Stuff